SC Eintracht Freising is a football club based in Freising, Germany. The club was founded on May 1st, 1927 and currently plays in the Landesliga Bayern-Südost

Players

First-team squad

Notable Players 

 Hans Pflügler played at SC Eintracht Freising from 1997 to 2001 and from 2002 to 2005. He has played for Bayern Munich, winning ten major titles and appearing in nearly 400 official games. Additionally, Pflügler represented West Germany at the Euro 1988 and 1990 World Cup, winning the tournament.

Maximilian Haas began his footballing career at SC Eintracht Freising, playing there until 2007. He would later go on to play for clubs such as Bayern Munich, Middlesbrough, and SC Braga until retired in 2013.

Stefan Haas began his youth career at SC Eintracht Freising, playing there until 2011. He would later go on to play for teams such as SC Mirandela and Leixões S.C.. He currently plays at VfR Garching.

Sebastian Bönig began his youth career at SC Eintracht Freising, playing there until 1996. He would later go on to play for clubs such as Bayern Munich and Union Berlin. He currently works as an assistant coach at Union Berlin.

Philipp Bönig began his youth career at SC Eintracht Freising, playing there until 1994. He would later go on to play for clubs such as Bayern Munich and Vfl Bochum. He currently works as the manager of VfR Garching.

Stefan Lex began his youth career at SC Eintracht Freising until he was signed by TSV Buchbach in 2009. He would later go on to play for clubs such as Greuther Fürth and FC Ingolstadt 04. He currently plays as a winger for 3. Liga club 1860 Munich.

References 

Football clubs in Bavaria
1948 establishments in Germany
Association football clubs established in 1948